This is a list of the 59 Members of Parliament (MPs) elected to the House of Commons of the United Kingdom by Scottish constituencies for the Fifty-fifth Parliament of the United Kingdom (2010 to 2015) at the 2010 United Kingdom general election.

Composition

List

By-elections
 2011 Inverclyde By-election, Ian McKenzie, Labour

See also 

 Lists of MPs for constituencies in Scotland

Lists of UK MPs 2010–2015
Lists of MPs for constituencies in Scotland
2010 United Kingdom general election